are traditional Japanese socks worn with thonged footwear such as zori, dating back to the 15th century.

History
Japanese  are usually understood today to be a kind of split-toed sock that is not meant to be worn alone outdoors, much like regular socks.  However,  were originally a kind of leather shoe made from a single animal hide, as evidenced by historical usage and the earlier form of the word, written , with the kanji literally signifying "single hide". As Japanese footwear evolved,  also changed, with the split-toe design emerging towards the late Heian period (794–1185 CE) to allow the wearer to accommodate the thong of  straw sandals to reinforce the sole. Outdoor versions of  involved some kind of reinforcement, with soles traditionally made of cloth, leather, or straw.

Brothers Tokujirō Ishibashi and Shōjirō Ishibashi, founders of the tyre company Bridgestone, are credited with the invention of rubber-soled  in 1922; these are now the dominant form of outdoor , and the term  generally refers to the indoor form.

Use 

 are worn by both men and women, with traditional formal footwear such as zori, and sometimes the less-formal geta.  are typically worn with clothing such as kimono.  are sewn with a divided toe, in order to be worn with thonged footwear.

Historically, most people in Japan wore , as most Japanese footwear was thonged; however, some, such as upper-class courtesans and the geisha of Fukagawa did not wear them, as the bare foot was considered to be erotic in Japanese culture. Others, such as lower-working class members of society who could not afford , either did not wear them or wore boots such as  instead.

In traditional Japanese spaces and buildings, such as Noh theatres, teahouses and for traditional stage performances,  must be worn, and shoes are not worn inside or on stage.

Styles 
White  are worn in formal situations such as tea ceremonies. Men sometimes will wear blue or black  for traveling. Colored  are also available, and are sometimes used in kabuki theatre as part of a character's costume, or are worn with more casual outfits as fashion.

Traditionally,  are sewn from cloth cut to form. They are open at the back to be slipped on and have fasteners along the opening (known as ) so they can be closed.  sewn from stretch material without fasteners are also available.

Made of heavier, tougher material and often having rubber soles,  resemble boots and are outer footwear rather than socks. Like other ,  also have divided toes.

Modern versions
Contemporary  socks—socks with a separation between the big toe and the rest of the toes—are also available. This reflects the number of people who still prefer to wear zori and geta, especially during Japan's hot, humid summers.

Modern  occasionally have elastic openings instead of fasteners.

Belgian fashion house Maison Margiela has released modern boots with a separated big toe since the late 1980s-early 1990s.

Gallery

See also
Zori

Geta

References

External links 
 The Museum of  website 
  at the Museum of Applied Arts and Sciences
  at the University of Michigan Museum of Art
  at the Metropolitan Museum of Art
 Maison Martin Margiela: Women's  boots at the RISD Museum

Samurai clothing
Socks
Japanese footwear
Japanese words and phrases